Luis Moya was a Mexican art director. He designed the sets for around fifty films during his career which spanned the Golden age of Mexican cinema.

Selected filmography
 Marvels of the Bull Ring (1943)
 My Memories of Mexico (1944)
 Ramona (1946)
 The Private Life of Mark Antony and Cleopatra (1947)
 The Bewitched House (1949)
 Lola Casanova (1949)
 The Great Madcap (1949)
 Gemma (1950)
 Streetwalker (1951)
 Here Comes Martin Corona (1952)

References

Bibliography
 Cotter, Bob. The Mexican Masked Wrestler and Monster Filmography. McFarland & Company, 2005.

External links

Year of birth unknown
Year of death unknown
Mexican art directors